Christmas EveL (pronounced "Christmas Evil") is a single album by South Korean boy band Stray Kids. It was released on November 29, 2021, through JYP Entertainment, and distributed by Dreamus, as part of the band's Season Song project. Marketed as a "holiday special single", it consists of four tracks, including the dual lead singles "Christmas EveL", and "Winter Falls", with a theme of "Christmas naughty boy" and a Christmas, hip hop, and pop sound. Commercially, the single album debuted atop the Gaon Album Chart, was certified triple platinum by Korea Music Content Association (KMCA), selling 750,000 copies, and was nominated for Album of the Year – 4th Quarter at the 11th Gaon Chart Music Awards.

Background

On January 1, 2021, New Year's Day, Stray Kids released the video Step Out 2021, consisting of the group's achievements in 2020, and 2021's to-do plan, including their project called Season Song. In 2021, the group made history after participating and won the Mnet competitive reality television show Kingdom: Legendary War, and releasing their second studio album Noeasy on August 23 with the lead single "Thunderous", which received an important musical success. The album debuted atop the Gaon Album Chart and sold over 1.2 million copies, becoming the first million-selling album by the group and their label JYP Entertainment. On November 11, the group released a mysterious poster to promote Christmas EveL. The project was later described as a "holiday special single" for their fans as a thank-you gift, as part of the Season Song project.

Music and lyrics

Christmas EveL is thirteen minutes and fifty seconds long, consisting of four tracks, categorized as a Christmas, hip hop and pop record with the theme "Christmas naughty boy". All tracks were produced and written by 3Racha, an in-house production team of Stray Kids, consisting of Bang Chan, Changbin, and Han. The group's member Felix and Korean American rapper Junoflo co-wrote the English lyrics of "Domino", originally included on the group's second studio album, Noeasy, with the original writer, Bang Chan. HotSauce, Nickko Young, Earattack, and Versachoi also participated in co-composing the tracks.

Christmas EveL opens with the title track, "Christmas EveL", a funky hip hop song, expressing the different points of view and downsides of Christmas, rather than romance and warmth. Elite Daily described the title track as an "anti-Christmas song". The Christmas-themed ballad second track, "24 to 25", is about wanting to spend time together from December 24 to 25, especially with their fans, called Stay, driven by a "calm" guitar sound. "Winter Falls", the third ballad pop track, details a person who tries to erase the complicated thoughts about a former relationship that come to mind during winter and the end of the year.

Release and promotion

On November 11, 2021, Stray Kids dropped a mysterious poster, titled Christmas EveL without knowing the format. The poster features a horrible, slightly off-smiley face in black, and a blood-like red background, showing 2 torn papers, the one features the red-font "Christmas Eve", and the one writes the "L" in flowing ink, as well as a release date: 2021.11.29. Marketed as the group's "holiday special single", previewing and pre-orders for the limited version of the CD began on the same day, and the standard version began on November 15. The group announced that they would not promote the songs on any music program, as a gift to their fans who have sent warm support and love in 2021.

The individual and group teaser photos were uploaded in two sets. The first shows the members in tartan-patterned outfits in an arcade. The second expresses the members tying a bow on their necks and wearing Christmas-themed outfits, surrounded by wrapped presents and a Christmas tree in the background. The official track listing was posted on November 19, serving "Christmas EveL" and "Winter Falls" as a double lead single on the record. Two music video teasers of "Christmas EveL" were released on November 20 and 27, while "Winter Falls" was released on November 22 and 28. A snippet video called "unveil: track" of "24 to 25" was uploaded on November 25, as well as the title track "Christmas EveL" via Instagram Reels on November 27. An accompanying music video for "Christmas EveL" was premiered alongside the single album release, "Winter Falls" the next day, and "24 to 25" on December 6. Although there is no promotion at the music shows, "Winter Falls" was given a debut performance at 2021 SBS Gayo Daejeon on December 25, alongside "Thunderous", arranged in the Christmas version. The next year, they performed "24 to 25", and "Christmas EveL" at its 2022 edition of the same program.

Critical reception

Writing for NME, Rhian Daly rated Christmas EveL four out of five stars, and said that aside from the English version of "Domino" that provides a "fiery end to the record", there is a "Christmassy atmosphere that runs neatly through the rest of the tracks". Daly did not see this as a negative though, commenting that "That's typical Stray Kids, though – always keeping us on our toes even when we think we've got them pegged." Christmas EveL was nominated for Album of the Year – 4th Quarter at 11th Gaon Chart Music Awards.

Commercial performance

In South Korea, Christmas EveL debuted at number one on the Gaon Album Chart for the date issue of November 28 – December 4, 2021, selling 654,658 copies as of November 2021, making it the group's sixth number-one album after Clé 1: Miroh, Clé: Levanter, Go Live, In Life, and Noeasy. The lead single "Christmas EveL" and "Winter Falls" entered the Gaon Digital Chart simultaneously at numbers 114 and 151, respectively. All of the single album's four tracks also debuted simultaneously on the Gaon Download Chart, where the lead singles debuted in the top 10. In the United States, the single album landed at number 25 on the Billboard Heatseekers Albums, as well as number 9 on Hungary's Album Top 40 Chart. Christmas EveL received a double platinum certification by Korea Music Content Association (KMCA) on February 10, 2022, and later a triple platinum on May 12.

Track listing

Notes

  signifies an English lyricist.

Credits and personnel

Credits adapted from the official website.

Musicians

 Stray Kids – lead vocals
 Bang Chan (3Racha) – lyrics , English lyrics , composition , arrangement , all instruments 
 Changbin (3Racha) – lyrics , composition 
 Han (3Racha) – background vocals , lyrics , composition 
 Felix – English lyrics 
 HotSauce – composition , arrangement , keyboard , drum programming , computer programming 
 Nickko Young – composition , arrangement , all instruments 
 Shin Ye-rin – strings 
 Earattack – composition , arrangement , background vocals , all instruments 
 Kim Jong-sung – guitar 
 Junoflo – English lyrics 
 Versachoi – composition , arrangement , all instruments 

Technical

 KayOne Lee – digital editing 
 Goo Hye-jin – recording 
 Choi Hye-jin – recording 
 Bang Chan (3Racha) – recording 
 Manny Marroquin – mixing 
 Jay-P Gu – mixing 
 Lee Tae-sub – mixing 
 Yoon Won-kwon – mixing 
 Chris Galland – mix engineering 
 Zach Pereyra – assistant
 Anthony Vilchis – assistant
 Kang Sun-young – mix engineering 
 Chris Gehringer – mastering 
 Kwon Nam-woo – mastering 

Locations

 JYP Publishing (KOMCA) – original publishing 
 Copyright Control – original publishing 
 JYPE Studios – recording , mixing 
 Channie's "Room" – recording 
 Larrabee Studios – mixing 
 Klang Studio – mixing 
 Studio DDeepKick – mixing 
 Sterling Sound – mastering 
 821 Sound Mastering – mastering

Charts

Weekly charts

Monthly charts

Year-end charts

Certifications and sales

Release history

Notes

See also
 List of Gaon Album Chart number ones of 2021

References

2021 EPs
Christmas albums by South Korean artists
Christmas EPs
JYP Entertainment EPs
Korean-language EPs
Single albums
Stray Kids EPs